Benjamin Watkins Leigh (June 18, 1781February 2, 1849) was an American lawyer and politician from Richmond, Virginia. He served in the Virginia House of Delegates and represented Virginia in the United States Senate.

Early and family life
Benjamin Watkins Leigh was born at "Gravel Hill", the glebe of Dale Parish in Chesterfield County on June 18, 1781, the son of the Reverend William Leigh (d. 1787) and Elizabeth (Watkins) Leigh (d. 1799). He attended the College of William and Mary, studied law, and began practicing in Petersburg in 1802, as well as helped raise his younger brother William.

Benjamin Watkins Leigh married three times: on December 24, 1802, to Mary Selden Watkins; on November 30, 1813, to Susan Colston; on November 24, 1821, to Julia Wickham.

Career
After representing Dinwiddie County in the Virginia House of Delegates 1811-13, Leigh moved to Richmond, where he rose rapidly in his chosen profession. He prepared the revised Code of Virginia in 1819, was a delegate to the Virginia Constitutional Convention of 1829-1830, a reporter of the Virginia Court of Appeals 1829-41, and was again elected to the Virginia legislature, representing Henrico County in the session of 1830-31. Leigh was appointed by the state legislature as a Whig to the United States Senate to fill the vacancy caused by the resignation of William Cabell Rives; he was reelected in 1835.

During Leigh's time in the Senate, the controversy over slavery reached new levels of intensity.  The House of Representatives passed a "gag rule" tabling all anti-slavery petitions, and a similar measure died in the Senate, though that body approved an alternate method of ignoring such petitions.  President Jackson called on the Congress to censor anti-slavery publications from the federal mails, a bill the Senate defeated 25-19.  Leigh proposed a statewide boycott of pro-emancipation newspapers, writing that Virginians had the right "to suppress to the utmost of our power what we deem inflammatory, dangerous, mischievous."
 
Every State had expressed the disapproval of South Carolina's nullification and it was Leigh who was sent to urge South Carolina to desist from carrying matters to extremities. Leigh served until his resignation on July 4, 1836. Thereafter he resumed the practice of law in Richmond.

Benjamin Watkins Leigh was a founding member (1831) of the Virginia Historical Society and first chairman of its standing committee.

Death and legacy
Leigh died in Richmond on February 2, 1849, and is buried in Shockoe Hill Cemetery.

His home at Richmond, the Benjamin Watkins Leigh House, was listed on the National Register of Historic Places in 1969.

References

Sources
Dictionary of American Biography
Dunn, Susan.  Dominion of Memories: Jefferson, Madison, & the Decline of Virginia.  Cambridge: Basic Books, 2007
Hall, Cline Edwin. “The Political Life of Benjamin Watkins Leigh.” Master’s thesis, University of Richmond, 1959
Macfarland, William H. An Address on the Life, Character, and Public Services of the Late Hon. Benjamin Watkins Leigh. Richmond: Macfarlane and Fergusson, 1851.
Encyclopedia of Virginia Biography, Volume II

External links
biographic sketch at U.S. Congress website

1781 births
1849 deaths
People from Chesterfield County, Virginia
National Republican Party United States senators from Virginia
Virginia National Republicans
Virginia Whigs
Members of the Virginia House of Delegates
Politicians from Richmond, Virginia
Virginia lawyers
College of William & Mary alumni